The Roman Catholic Diocese of Homa Bay is a diocese located in the city of Homa Bay in the Ecclesiastical province of Kisumu in Kenya.

History
 October 18, 1993: Established as Diocese of Homa Bay from the Diocese of Kisii

Leadership
 Bishops of Homa Bay (Roman rite)
 Bishop Linus Okok Okwach (18 Oct 1993  – 20 Feb 2002)
 Bishop Philip Arnold Subira Anyolo (22 Mar 2003  – 15 Nov 2019), appointed Archbishop of Kisumu
Bishop Michael Cornelius Otieno Odiwa (Nov 2020   –  )

See also
Roman Catholicism in Kenya
Kenya Conference of Catholic Bishops

References

Sources
 GCatholic.org
 Catholic Hierarchy
 Homa Bay Partnership with the Diocese of St. Cloud 

Roman Catholic dioceses in Kenya
Christian organizations established in 1993
Roman Catholic dioceses and prelatures established in the 20th century
Roman Catholic Ecclesiastical Province of Kisumu